A snurposome is a granular structure in the nuclei of amphibian oocytes.  Snurposomes contain snRNPs and are divided into the subtypes A, B, and C.
A B snurposome is composed of thousands of particles which have diameters between 20 and 30 nanometers.  B snurposomes may be forms of splicing speckles.

References 

 
 

Nuclear substructures